Kjell Gjerseth (born 14 September 1946) is a Norwegian novelist and journalist.

He hails from Stavanger. He was awarded the Tarjei Vesaas' debutantpris in 1983 for the novel Chakoo. Among his other books is Hvis du ikke er snill. Historier om Lindøy from 1993. He was awarded the Narvesen Prize in 1983 for his journalistic work.

References

1946 births
Living people
Norwegian journalists
20th-century Norwegian novelists
21st-century Norwegian novelists